Yūji Tokizaki (6 January 1940 – 13 November 2021) was a Japanese politician. A member of the Japan Socialist Party, he served in the House of Representatives from 1990 to 1993.

References

1940 births
2021 deaths
Members of the House of Representatives (Japan)
Social Democratic Party (Japan) politicians
Democratic Party of Japan politicians
People from Aomori Prefecture